Bernie Siegel (born October 14, 1932) is an American writer and retired pediatric surgeon, who writes on the relationship between the patient and the healing process. He is known for his best-selling book Love, Medicine and Miracles.

Early life and education
Siegel was born on October 14, 1932 in Brooklyn, New York. He received a B.A. from Colgate University and his M.D. from  Cornell University Medical College, graduating with Phi Beta Kappa and Alpha Omega Alpha honors.
He was trained in surgery at Yale–New Haven Hospital, West Haven Veteran’s Hospital and the UPMC Children's Hospital of Pittsburgh.

Career

Physician
Siegel practiced general medicine and pediatric surgery until 1989, when he retired from Yale as an Assistant Clinical Professor of General and Pediatric Surgery.

Medical research and advocacy

Psychosocial support therapy
Exceptional Cancer Patients (ECP) is a non-profit organization founded by Siegel in 1978.  As described in a 1989 article in The New York Times, patients "with cancer and such other serious illnesses as AIDS and multiple sclerosis use group and individual psychotherapy, imagery exercises and dream work to try to unravel their emotional distress, which, Siegel says, strongly contributes to their physical maladies." The ECP was created to provide resources, professional training programs and interdisciplinary retreats that help people facing the challenges of cancer and other chronic illnesses. In the fall of 1999, the Mind-Body Wellness Center (owned and operated by Meadville Medical Center and MMC Health Systems, Inc., a non-profit organization) acquired and assumed operations of the ECaP.

In 2008, Jerome Groopman, reviewing Anne Harrington's The Cure Within: A History of Mind-Body Medicine, noted that a study by David Spiegel which (Harrington wrote) appeared to support Siegel's claims that breast cancer was partly caused by emotional turmoil, and that "dramatic remissions could occur if patients simply gave up their emotional repression, without chemotherapy or radiation." However, Groopman noted that later trials failed to show any significant beneficial effects.

Siegel's theories concerning the purported benefits of psychosocial support therapy remain unproven. He has stated: "a vigorous immune system can overcome cancer if it is not interfered with, and emotional growth toward greater self-acceptance and fulfillment helps keep the immune system strong", but Stephen Barret argues that Siegel has published no scientific study supporting these claims. A cohort study intended to measure the effects of positive mental imagery on breast cancer survival rates found no significant impact. Earlier indications of strong beneficial effects in the study were found to be a statistical error due to selection bias. However, a possible effect could not be ruled out, as the study had a "relative lack of statistical power", and that "the program might have other beneficial effects on the quality of life".

Siegel is an Academic Director of the Experiential Health and Healing program at The Graduate Institute in Bethany, Connecticut.

Literary reviews
Literary critic Anatole Broyard, writing in The New York Times, describes him as "a sort of Donald Trump of critical illness" and "not a gifted writer"; and while agreeing that Siegel is a surgeon, writes that he "might sometimes be mistaken for a pop psychiatrist." Broyard is critical of some of Siegel's practices, such as "imaging", where cancer patients imagine their good cells defeating their bad cells. Yet, Broyard concludes, Siegel does bring "an element of camaraderie" and offers patients hope, which is "a godsend to many people who are too sick to object to his style."

Los Angeles Times reviewer Joan Borysenko described Siegel's first book, Love, Medicine and Miracles, as "incredibly inspiring and sure to be controversial".  She commented,  "Excellent research is reviewed side-by-side with uncontrolled, highly questionable studies." Describing Siegel as an "extremist" who "views cancer and nearly all diseases as psychosomatic", the review concluded that "his message distills down to one that the head may question, but in which the heart delights".  A second Los Angeles Times review of the same book said, "The book works best as a passionate exhortation to care for yourself, emotionally as well as physically. As a treatise on disease, it's trendy but ultimately oppressive."

In 1988, Siegel's Love, Medicine and Miracles ranked #9 on The New York Times Best Seller list of hardcover nonfiction books. The book remained on the Times bestseller list for more than a year. The paperback version was on The New York Times Best Seller list from 1988 - 1994. It was also included in Sheldon Zerden's The Best of Health: The 100 Best Health Books. His book Peace, Love and Healing hit The New York Times Best Seller list (paperback) in 1989.

Mind Body Spirit magazine ranked him #25 on their 2012 list, "The Spiritual 100".

Appearances in films and television
Siegel was a "key figure" in the 1988 television movie Leap of Faith, later rendered Question of Faith in VHS, written by Bruce Hart.

1n 1992, Frank Perry's autobiographical film On the Bridge shows Perry, with prostate cancer, going to a weekend seminar led by Siegel.

Bernie Siegel appears in the 2012 film "The Cure Is", alongside Bruce H. Lipton, Joel Fuhrman, Fabrizio Mancini, Marianne Williamson, Gregg Braden, Sue Morter, Paul Chek.

Personal life
Siegel lived with his wife Bobbie in Connecticut until she died in her sleep in 2018. They have five adult children. He has said that he reads the Bible often and uses it for inspiration.

Works

Books
 1986Love, Medicine & MiraclesHarperCollins Publishers, 
 1989Peace, Love & HealingHarperCollins Publishers, 
 1993How to Live Between Office VisitsHarperCollins Publishers, 
 1999Prescriptions for LivingHarperCollins Publishers, 
 2003365 Prescriptions For the SoulNew World Library, 
 2003Help Me To HealHay House, 
 2004Smudge BunnyChildren's bookIllustrated by Laura J. BryantNew World Library/HJ Kramer, 
 2006Love, Magic, and Mudpies: Raising Your Kids to Feel Loved, Be Kind, and Make a DifferenceRodale Books, 
 2009Faith, Hope and Healing: Inspiring Lessons Learned from People Living with CancerWiley, 
 2009101 Exercises for the Soul: Simple Practices for a Healthy Body, Mind, and SpiritNew World Library, 
 2011A Book Of Miracles: Inspiring True Stories of Healing, Gratitude, and LoveNew World Library, 
 2013The Art of Healing: Uncovering Your Inner Wisdom and Potential for Self-HealingNew World Library,

Recordings
 2004Meditations for Peace of Mind (Prescriptions for Living) (Audiobook, CD)Hay House, 
 2006Love, Magic, and Mudpies: Raising Your Kids to Feel Loved, Be Kind, and Make a Difference (Audio Edition)Gildan Media, LLC

Films
 1989An Evening With Dr. Bernie SiegelUpstate Media Enterprises
 1994Voices of the New AgeHartley Film Foundation
 1995Hope and a Prayer: How Hope, Humor and Love Can HealBernie Seigel M.D.Hay House
 1997Fight for Your LifeVaried Directions/ The Hoffman Collection
 1996Bernie Siegel: How to Live Between Office VisitsMystic Fire Video
 1998Love Medicine & MiraclesMystic Fire Video
 1999A Conversation with Bernie SiegelWisdom Television
 2011What If?: the MovieAwakening to Our Unlimited SelfJames A. Sinclair documentary
 Bernie Siegel, M.D.Inner Vision: Visualizing Super HealthHartley Film Foundation

References

Further reading

External links 

Bernie Siegel Q & A on Lumenz networks

1932 births
Living people
American children's writers
American health and wellness writers
American motivational speakers
American pediatric surgeons
American spiritual writers
Colgate University alumni
American people of Jewish descent
Weill Cornell Medical College alumni
Writers from Brooklyn
People in alternative medicine
Physicians from New York City